Alexandra Dementieva (Александра Дементьева) (born 1960, Moscow, USSR) is an artist who has created works of electronic, video, interactive and installation art since 1992.

Biography
Dementieva spent much of her childhood with her grandfather Eugene Volkov, a biochemist, who instilled in her a love of science.  She graduated from Moscow State University of Printing Arts in 1985. Her artistic career began in 1984 when she originally practiced painting and drawing. In 1990 she moved to Belgium and began experimenting with Amiga 2000, Macintosh, PC computers and videocamera Hi8. She was interested in anthropology and psychology, particularly in behaviorism, which led her to create an interactive environment. She graduated from Academy of Fine arts Watermael-Boitsfort in Brussels. In 1999 she became one of the co-founders of IMAL (Interactive Media Art Laboratory) in Brussels.

Career
Dementieva's work is influenced by contemporary film directors like David Lynch, Jean-Luc Godard and David Cronenberg, to name but a few. Her use of the cut-up technique invites comparison with the cinematic montage as a method for altering reality that has been recorded.  However, Dementieva's editing depends largely upon audience participation, the chance and choices that she expects her viewers to make.  This interactivity is an essential element in all her work. She has made spectator involvement an integral part of the creative process. She explores contemporary trends in the construction of a narrative, and questions the very process of storytelling by stepping aside and offering every viewer the power to reshape and manipulate the original imagery or plot. The sliced layers offer interesting juxtapositions and can derive new meaning or create a new contextual relationship in the viewer's mind. Her methods are akin to contemporary VJ manipulations, musical remixing and recycling.  Her visualisations echo Dadaist experimentations with texts or Russian absurdist's poetry.  The space she creates for each installation “stimulates unconditional mental freedom” Faina Balakhovskaya; it is fluid, responsive and transformative.

Her interactive installations, exhibited in Brussels, Moscow and New York City, were described by artist Barbara Rosenthal as "Technically proficient, visually striking, fundamentally simple despite the mechanical and computational pyrotechnics she and her associates put themselves through to produce them, her works draw spectators into them, and in ways that circle back into their own minds."

Her work has been exhibited in France, Brazil, United States, Spain, Mexico, Germany, Switzerland, Korea, Italy, etc.

Solo exhibitions
'The white is not what it seems', Nadine, Brussels (Belgium), 2019
'10 Installations', MMOMA, Moscow (Russia), 2017
'Parallel Dimensions', Marion De Cannière gallery, Antwerp (Belgium), 2013
'Universal Recording', EI (Experimental Intermedia), Ghent (Belgium), 2012
 , Moscow (Russia), 2009
 CCNOA, Brussels (Belgium), 2009
'Non Unexpected Encounters' RSUH Museum Center, Moscow (Russia), 2008
'Psyche and the Digital', Neutral Ground gallery, Regina (Canada), 2007

References

Further reading
Dannie.r – KQ magazine ( Texts by Alexandra Dementieva, Natasha Kourchanova, Zandrine Chiri)
The fragility of human existence. Interview by Richard Bright
Alexandra Dementieva "10 Installations" catalogue (texts by Elena Selina, Olga Shishko, Sandrine Chiri)
 Alexandra Dementieva: ‘All art is an interactive game. I am offering the viewer an opportunity to take an active part in the work’ interview by Natasha Kurchanova
Дело мастера: как устроен рабочий процесс художницы Александры Дементьевой. Мария Крамар
 Focus. Een blik op 100 kunstenaars (D/2012/0012/18), text by Hans Theys)
 Article of Antonio Geusa, Psyche and the Digital: A Journey Aboard of Lumière’s Train through Alexandra Dementieva
 'Russian Artists Rep The New Media Scene At The Venice Biennale'
 «ŽEN D’АRТ. THE GENDER HISTORY OF ART IN THE POST-SOVIET SPACE: 1989—2009» (Moscow: 2010, texts by Nataliya Kamenetskaya, Oksana Sarkisyan)
 "Russian Artists Abroad - 20 century", interviews by Erik Bulatov, Ilya Kabakov, Oscar Rabin, Vladimir Yankilevsky, Alexandra Dementieva, ... NCCA (National Centre for Contemporary Arts), Moscow, Russia, 2010
 'Over Vorm, Hans Theys' (D/2009/8545/3)
 'Alexandra Dementieva. Works 2000 - 2007' catalogue (Publication; XL gallery, texts by Faina Balakhovskaya, Antonio Geusa, Luc Lambrecht, interview by Alexandra Obuhova)
 The Residents (Bruxelles : Argos, 2007)

External links
 
BAM - the Flemish institute for visual, audiovisual and media art in Belgium
 iMAL - Center for Digital Culture and Technology
 Tokyo Wonder Site Residency
 Anti-Utopias - a curated contemporary art project 
 Contemporary art and technology
 Contemporary Art and Eastern Europe
 ADA - Archive of Digital Art
 Cyland - Media Art Laboratory

1960 births
Living people
Russian installation artists
Russian video artists
New media artists
Russian women artists
Kandinsky Prize